The Pond Hill School is a historic school building at 65 Old Paine Hollow Road (old Route 6) in Wellfleet, Massachusetts.  The plain Greek Revival two story schoolhouse was built in 1857, and is the only period schoolhouse in Wellfleet to survive relatively intact.  The building served as a schoolhouse until 1880, and was purchased six years later by the South Wellfleet Ladies Social Union.  In 1945, with that organization in decline, the property was given to a neighborhood association, which maintains the building.

The building was listed on the National Register of Historic Places in 1989.

See also
National Register of Historic Places listings in Barnstable County, Massachusetts

References

School buildings on the National Register of Historic Places in Massachusetts
Wellfleet, Massachusetts
National Register of Historic Places in Barnstable County, Massachusetts